Madrigueras is a municipality in Albacete, Castile-La Mancha, Spain. It has a population of 4,917 according to the official statistics by the National Statistics Institute of Spain (INE). The principal productions of this village are wine, knives and spatulas. Madrigueras is referred to as "Little China" due to the great number of inhabitants who use bikes for transportation.

References

External links
 http://www.madrigueras.es Homepage of Madrigueras (in Spanish)

Municipalities of the Province of Albacete